Chitika, Inc. (pronounced CHIH-tih-ka) was a search-targeted advertising company. It was located in Westborough, Massachusetts, United States. The name Chitika means "in a snap" in Telugu language.

On April 17, 2019, Chitika announced that they were shutting down their business.

History
In 2003, co-founders Venkat Kolluri and Alden DoRosario started Chitika after leaving their jobs at search engine-based company "Lycos". Since launching its online advertising service in 2004, Chitika has added a Mobile advertising Division as well as a Real-Time Bidding Division. 
In 2015, Chitika's founders announced Cidewalk, their local mobile ad platform, would spin off into a separate business unit with $4 Million in seed funding and new office space in Southborough, MA.

On April 17, 2019, Chitika wrote to publishers advising them of their immediate cessation of business. The email advised publishers to remove all Chitika code from their website. The email further advised publishers that they would not be paid for impressions or clicks occurring since March 1, 2019.

Partnerships
In 2009, Chitika began a partnership with the b5media Network.

In 2010, Yahoo! closed their AdSense competitor Yahoo Publisher Network Online (YPNO) and recommended publishers migrate to Chitika as a replacement.

In 2013, Chitika announced a multi-year extension of its partnership with Yahoo!. The agreement includes off–network search syndication, monetization of Yahoo! owned and operated properties, and mobile ad serving and monetization.

Awards and recognition
 2007
 Inc. top free services for generating revenue on your website: Best For Promoting Ancillary Products
 2008
 AlwaysOn: Top 100 fastest-growing companies in the Northeast
 Red Herring: Leading private technology companies in North America
 MITX 2008 Technology Awards: Finalist, Marketing/Customer Relationship Technologies Category
 2009
 Red Herring: Top 100 Global 2008 Winner
 2010
  DPAC Award Finalist for Best Mobile Advertising Network Innovation
 2011
 TiE Boston: Chitika CEO Venkat Kolluri Awarded "Crystal Award." The Crystal Award is given to a TiE Charter Member for building and growing a company from the ground up with no external funding.
 2013
 Boston Business Journal: Healthiest Employer 2013 Finalist
 2015 
 AdExchanger: Cidewalk Hooks Up With Yahoo Small Business To Reach More Mom-And-Pops.

Controversies
In December 2005, some publishers reported a reduction in revenue after auditing between 25%-90%.

In 2010, Chitika removed their ads from thousands of websites. The company stated that the sites they had been doing business with were all suddenly placed under "Pending Review" or "Pending Further Review" status. This meant the company would no longer show ads on the sites. Many dropped the advertising service.

On March 16, 2011, the Federal Trade Commission (FTC) appeared before the United States Senate Commerce Committee and announced its first behavioral advertising case, filed against Chitika for use of a deceptive opt-out mechanism. According to the FTC, Chitika's cookies that opt users out of behavioral tracking were expiring in ten days rather than the stated ten years. A settlement was reached under which Chitika was forbidden from making misleading statements about the extent of data collection about consumers and the extent to which consumers can control the use of their data. Further, the settlement required that Chitika link all its advertising to an effective opt-out mechanism in future. It has been commented that, “this requirement of a hyperlink embedded in online advertisements is a good indicator of the type of Do Not Track mechanism that will be acceptable to the FTC if “Do Not Track” becomes mandatory.” According to a press release by the company, their opt-out cookies have been set to ten days since March 2010 when the FTC began their investigation. Chitika subsequently claimed to have made only a total of fifty-five cents from the ten-day opt-out expiration.

Delaying and denying payments

In 2017, Chitika shocked its publishers by changing the minimum payout from $10 to $50. It affected many existing publishers who joined Chitika for its lower payout option. Publishers who cross $50 are banned from the network.

On April 17, 2019, Chitika wrote to publishers advising them of their immediate cessation of business. The email advised publishers to remove all Chitika code from their website. The email further advised publishers that they would not be paid for impressions or clicks occurring since March 1, 2019.

References

Digital marketing companies of the United States
Companies based in Massachusetts
Online advertising services and affiliate networks